Dartans is a townland in County Tyrone, Northern Ireland. It is situated in the barony of Omagh West and the civil parish of Urney and covers an area of 367 acres. 

The name derives from the Irish: dartan (A place where cows or herds graze) or dartain (Knolls or hillocks).

The population of the townland declined during the 19th century:

See also
List of townlands of County Tyrone

References

Townlands of County Tyrone
Civil parish of Urney